Fox Creek is a  tributary of Schoharie Creek in Schoharie and Albany counties in the U.S. state of New York.  It rises in the southeastern part of the town of Berne, west of the Helderberg Mountains, and flows west, passing through the hamlets of East Berne, Bensons Corner, Berne, and West Berne, continuing through the town of Wright, where it passes the hamlets of Gallupville and Shutter Corners before entering the town of Schoharie, where it flows into Schoharie Creek near the hamlet of Vroman Corners.  Fox Creek is part of the Hudson River watershed, Via Schoharie Creek and the Mohawk River.

Near its mouth it is crossed by the Schoharie Bridge, a covered bridge near the Old Stone Fort, an American Revolutionary War-era structure.

Hydrology
The United States Geological Survey (USGS) maintains stream gauges along Fox Creek.

Tributaries
Louse Kill converges with Fox Creek near Schoharie, New York. Ox Kill converges with Fox Creek near Gallupville, New York. King Creek converges with Fox Creek in Gallupville, New York.

See also
List of rivers of New York

References 

Rivers of Schoharie County, New York
Rivers of Albany County, New York
Rivers of New York (state)
Tributaries of the Hudson River